The 1983 NAIA men's ice hockey tournament involved four schools playing in single-elimination bracket to determine the national champion of men's NAIA college ice hockey. The 1983 tournament was the 16th men's ice hockey tournament to be sponsored by the NAIA.   The tournament began on February 25, 1983 and ended with the championship game on February 25, 1983.

Bracket
Wessman Arena, Superior, Wisconsin

Note: * denotes overtime period(s)

References

External links 
 NAIA ice hockey

Ice
NAIA Men's Ice Hockey Championship
NAIA Ice Hockey Championship 
NAIA Ice Hockey Championship